The LOV-1 (Croatian: Lako Oklopno Vozilo or Light Armoured Vehicle) is a wheeled non-amphibious armoured personnel carrier currently in use with the Croatian army and EULEX.

History
During the Croatian War of Independence the Croatian army lacked a proper light armoured personnel carrier. The Croatian Ministry of Defense asked local firms to provide a solution for a light, fast and reliable armoured personnel carrier which could be produced quickly and in large quantities, without the need to import parts from abroad due to a UN arms embargo imposed on Croatia at the time.

Torpedo, a local firm from Rijeka, developed a basic armoured personnel carrier based on the TK-130 T-7 4x4 military truck, itself a licensed-produced and uprated TAM 110 from Slovenian TAM. The Army ordered 50 LOV-1 vehicles in late 1993, with the initial batch being delivered in 1994 and presented to the public on a military parade in May 1995 in Zagreb.

All LOV-1s are currently being replaced by numerous Patria AMV and MRAP vehicles recently acquired. However, several specialized vehicles are still being actively used as of 2015-2016. The remainder, along with other older but operable equipment, are to be kept stored but in operational state for the needs of the 20,000-strong reserve force presently being created. For this, annual check-ups and basic maintenance works are performed regularly with vehicles kept in hangars and under roofed shelters.

Versions
 LOV-OP - basic variant armed with M2 Browning machine gun for transporting up to eight infantrymen
 LOV-Z - unarmed command variant with additional radio equipment, air-conditioning and sound insulation
 LOV-IZV - reconnaissance and scout vehicle armed with a 20mm RT-20 heavy sniper rifle and a light 8-round 60mm MLRS called Obad (Horse-fly)
 LOV-ABK - NBC warfare vehicle 
 LOV-RAK 24/128 mm - equipped with a 24-tube 128mm MLRS, only 2 prototypes built
 LOV-UP1 - artillery observation vehicle for directing artillery fire and spotting enemy artillery positions equipped with GPS, thermal imaging, laser range finder and ground artillery radar  
 LOV-UP2 - artillery command vehicle
 LOV-ED - electronic warfare vehicle
 LOV T2 - improved variant that entered service in 1997, only a few built

Combat history
The LOV-1 saw action in the Croatian War of Independence, particularly in Operations Flash and Storm.

References

 
 

Wheeled armoured personnel carriers
Combat vehicles of Croatia
Military vehicles introduced in the 1990s
Armoured personnel carriers of the post–Cold War period